Jakob Voelkerling Persson (born 27 September 2000) is a Swedish football defender who plays for IK Sirius.

Career

He started his career with Helsingborgs IF.

References

2000 births
Living people
Swedish footballers
Association football defenders
Helsingborgs IF players
Ängelholms FF players
IK Sirius Fotboll players
Allsvenskan players
Superettan players
Ettan Fotboll players